A milk bath is a bath taken in milk instead of water. Often other scents such as honey, rose, daisies and essential oils are added. Milk baths use lactic acid, an alpha hydroxy acid, to dissolve the proteins which hold together dead skin cells.

History 
There are legends that Cleopatra bathed in goat milk daily for her complexion. These legends have not been confirmed and some historians believe that Roman Empress Poppaea set this bathing fashion after Cleopatra's death.

Queens Catherine Parr and later Elizabeth I of England used milk baths to make their skin appear more youthful and pale.

Tincture of benzoin was also referred to as a 'milk bath' in 1800s America, which could in some cases be confused for baths of cows milk, also popular in the time.

There are references of cows milk as a bath technique found in India in the 1800s in "Fifty-one years of Victorian life" by the Dowager Countess of Jersey.

In the early 1900s, singer and Broadway star Anna Held was reported to bathe in milk daily but was later quoted as having bathed in milk 2 times a week when living in Paris but found it difficult to do so while traveling. Her husband Florenz Ziegfeld Jr. later reported to the press that she bathed in milk daily and set up photo shoots so that reporters could photograph the milk being delivered to her.

A buttermilk bath   was also a common historical bathing technique for show animals and remains to be in practice today (such as pigs and dogs).

In folklore 
According to scholars, milk baths were used "as a recipe for beauty", as well for healing, rejuvenation and disenchantment.

In film and media 

A milk bath for supposed medicinal purposes for a dying child can be seen in the 1931 film Night Nurse.
 Poppaea (Claudette Colbert) bathes in milk in the 1932 film The Sign of the Cross.
In Gigi, Aunt Alicia is seen taking a milk bath with lace lining the bathtub.
In Carry On Cleo (1964), Mark Antony first encounters Cleopatra while she is taking a milk bath.
In the 1973 film Charlotte's Web, Edith Zuckerman, Homer's wife, suggests giving Wilbur a buttermilk bath in preparation for the fair.
Queen Ravenna (Charlize Theron) is depicted bathing in a milk bath while wearing her crown in the 2012 film Snow White and the Huntsman
A milk bath can be observed in season 1, episode 9 of the Spartacus television series, performed by Lucretia (Lucy Lawless).
Ran Jutul (Synnøve Macody Lund) is seen taking a milk bath in Norwegian television series Ragnarok, season 1 episode 4.

Various ingredients 

Mandatory
 Fresh milk or powdered milk
Optional
 Water
 Honey
 Oatmeal
 Almond Meal
 Lavender
 Essential Oils
 Herbs
 Nutmeg
 Orris Root
 Bergamot oil
 Geranium oil
 Vitamin E oil
 Corn Starch
 Seaweed
 Sea salt

References

External links 
 Lavender-Honey Milk Bath

Bathing
Milk in culture